Carole Swan (born in Winnipeg, Manitoba) is a Canadian public servant was the President of the Canadian Food Inspection Agency from June 4, 2007 to July 10, 2011.

Career 

Before retiring from the Public Service, Swan served as President of the Canadian Food Inspection Agency  since appointment in June 2007. Swan held other senior positions within Senior Associate Deputy Minister at Industry Canada and the Treasury Board, as well as in a number of departments and agencies including the Privy Council Office, the Office of Privatization and Regulatory Affairs, the Department of Regional and Industrial Expansion, the Ministry of State for Economic Development, Status of Women Canada and the Department of Communications.

Education 

Swan received a Master's degree in Economics and a Bachelors Honours degree in Economics, both from the University of Manitoba.

References

20th-century Canadian civil servants
21st-century Canadian civil servants
People from Winnipeg
Place of birth missing (living people)
University of Manitoba alumni
Year of birth missing (living people)
Living people